Loanhead railway station served the town of Loanhead, Midlothian, Scotland, from 1874 to 1968 on the Edinburgh, Loanhead and Roslin Railway.

History 
The station was opened on 23 July 1874 by the Edinburgh, Loanhead and Roslin Railway. It was situated on the north side of Station Road. On the up side was the goods yard which had three sidings, the first and second serving a loading dock and the third serving a wooden goods shed. Access to this yard was controlled by a signal box, which was on the down side. To the north were further sidings which served Mactaggart Scott's engineering works. Even though it was the busiest station on the line, the station closed to passengers with the rest on 1 May 1933 but remained open for goods traffic. Passenger excursions continued in later years until 4 June 1960, the last excursion being a Sunday school outing. The station building was demolished in 1961. The station, as well as the goods yard, closed to goods 22 July 1968, although a private siding remained in use. The rest of the sidings and the track was later lifted. The yard was purchased by Mactaggart Scott and used as a storage facility. The private siding was finally lifted in 1996.

References 

Disused railway stations in Midlothian
Railway stations in Great Britain opened in 1874
Railway stations in Great Britain closed in 1933
1874 establishments in Scotland
1968 disestablishments in Scotland